Von Mansfield (born July 12, 1960) is a former defensive back in the National Football League.

Biography
Mansfield was born Edward Von Mansfield on July 12, 1960 in Anderson, Indiana.

Professional career
Mansfield was drafted in the fifth round of the 1982 NFL Draft by the Atlanta Falcons and played that season with the Philadelphia Eagles. After four years away from the NFL, he played  with the Green Bay Packers during the 1987 NFL season.

He played at the collegiate level at the University of Wisconsin-Madison.

See also
List of Philadelphia Eagles players
List of Green Bay Packers players

References

Sportspeople from Anderson, Indiana
Philadelphia Eagles players
Green Bay Packers players
American football defensive backs
University of Wisconsin–Madison alumni
Wisconsin Badgers football players
University School of Milwaukee alumni
1960 births
Living people